Roy John Rubin (born January 24, 1941) is an American rower. He competed in the men's coxed four event at the 1960 Summer Olympics.

References

1941 births
Living people
American male rowers
Olympic rowers of the United States
Rowers at the 1960 Summer Olympics
Sportspeople from Bellingham, Washington
Pan American Games medalists in rowing
Pan American Games gold medalists for the United States
Pan American Games bronze medalists for the United States
Rowers at the 1959 Pan American Games
Rowers at the 1963 Pan American Games